Isfahani or Ispahani is a surname of Iranian origin.  It may refer to the following:

 Al-Isfahani
 Al-Raghib al-Isfahani
 Imad ad-Din al-Isfahani
 Jalal al-Din Muhammad al-Isfahani

See also 
 Isfahan
 Al-Isfahani (disambiguation)
 Isfahani style

Iranian-language surnames
Toponymic surnames